Paul Goodman (1911–1972) was an American author, public intellectual, and social critic.

Paul Goodman may also refer to:

 Paul Goodman (historian) (1934–1995), American historian
 Paul Goodman (ice hockey) (1905–1959), American ice hockey player
 Paul Goodman (politician) (born 1959), British politician
 Paul Goodman (sound engineer)
 Paul Goodman (Zionist) (1875–1949), British Zionist
 Paul S. Goodman (1937–2012), American organizational psychologist and filmmaker